The Slovenian Association for Practical Shooting, Slovenian Slovenska zveza za praktično strelstvo (SZPS), is the Slovenian association for practical shooting under the International Practical Shooting Confederation. The association was founded 9 March 1994.

External links 
 Official homepage of the Slovenian Association for Practical Shooting

References 

Regions of the International Practical Shooting Confederation
Sports organizations of Slovenia
Organizations established in 1994
1994 establishments in Slovenia